As of 2022, Japanese musician Sugizo has released 7 studio albums and 23 singles as a solo artist and has collaborated with many other artists.

Studio albums 
 Truth? (November 19, 1997), Oricon Peak Position: #12
 C:Lear (October 1, 2003) #56
 Flower of Life (December 14, 2011) #62
 Tree of Life (December 14, 2011) #69
  #132
 Oneness M (November 29, 2017) #23
  #87

EPs 
 Sugizo x Hataken: The Voyage to The Higher Self (February 16, 2022)

Remix albums 
 Replicant Lucifer (August 27, 1997) #24
 Replicant Prayer (November 6, 1997) #54
 Replicant Truth？ (December 21, 1997)
 Spirituarise (December 5, 2007)
 Vesica Pisces (March 6, 2013) #227
 Replicants (October 25, 2017) #232
 Switched-On Oto (May 29, 2018) #202

Compilation albums 
 Sugizo meets Frank Zappa (December 22, 1999)
 Cosmoscape (July 23, 2008) #69
 Spiritual Classic Sugizo Selection (September 24, 2014) #133
 Spiritual Classic Sugizo Selection II (July 8, 2015) #123
 Cosmoscape II (December 15, 2018) #74

Live albums 
 Live in Tokyo (2020) #74

Soundtracks 
 Parallel Side of Soundtrack (November 14, 2001)
 H・Art・Chaos ~Suichoku no Yume~ (December 31, 2001)
 Music from the Original Motion Picture Soundtrack (February 27, 2002) #80
 Silent Voice ~Acoustic Songs of Soundtrack~ (May 9, 2002)
 Nemuri Kyoshiro Burai-hikae (May 14, 2010)
 7Doors ~Bluebeard's Castle~ (May 30, 2012)
 Tokyo Decibels ~Original Motion Picture Soundtrack~ (May 17, 2017)

Singles 
 "Lucifer" (July 9, 1997) #8
 "A Prayer" (September 10, 1997) #7
 "Rest in Peace & Fly Away" (April 10, 2002) #46
 Sugizo feat. bice
 "Super Love" (August 21, 2002) #42
 Sugizo & the Spank Your Juice
 "Dear Life" (November 20, 2002) #47
 Sugizo & the Spank Your Juice
 "No More Machine Guns Play the Guitar" (January 24, 2003) #50
 Sugizo & the Spank Your Juice
 "Tell Me Why You Hide the Truth?" (December 16, 2009)
 "Messiah" (December 16, 2009)
 "Do-Funk Dance" (January 27, 2010)
 "Fatima" (January 27, 2010)
 "Prana" (February 24, 2010)
 "Dear Spiritual Life" (March 31, 2010)
 "No More Nukes Play the Guitar" (April 13, 2011)
 "The Edge" (April 13, 2011)
 "Miranda" (June 29, 2011)
 Sugizo feat. MaZDA
 "Neo Cosmoscape" (July 27, 2011)
 Remixed by System 7
 "Enola Gay" (August 15, 2011)
 "Pray for Mother Earth" (September 11, 2011)
 Sugizo feat. Toshinori Kondo
 "Final of the Messiah" (August 29, 2012)
 Remix by System 7
 "Super Love 2012" (September 11, 2012)
 Sugizo feat. Coldfeet
 "Life on Mars?" (August 15, 2016)
 "Lux Aeterna" (September 30, 2016)
 "Raummusik" (October 31, 2016)
 
 Sugizo feat. Glim Spanky
 
 Sugizo feat. KOM_I (Wednesday Campanella)
 "A Red Ray" (June 25, 2019)
 Sugizo feat. miwa
 
 Sugizo feat. Aina The End (BiSH)
 
 Sugizo feat. Maki Ohguro

Other discography

With The Flare 
 "Inner Child" (August 25, 2004) #70
 
 "Positivity" (June 1, 2005) #104
  #93
 The Flare (February 8, 2006) #95

With Juno Reactor 
 Gods & Monsters (April 22, 2008)
 The Golden Sun of the Great East (April 24, 2013)

With X Japan 
 "Scarlet Love Song" (June 8, 2011)
 "Jade" (June 28, 2011)
 "Born to Be Free" (November 6, 2015)

With Shag 
 The Protest Jam (July 1, 2022) #74

Session discography 
 Issay; Flowers (1994) – violin on "Asamade Matenai"
 Media Youth; Spirit (1995)
 Tracy Huang; Crazy for Love (1998) – "So Near, yet so far Away - 咫尺天涯" composed and produced by Sugizo
 Glay; Pure Soul (1998) – guitar on "Fried Chicken and Beer"
 d-kiku; Miniature Garden (1998) – violin on "Tamarisque", guitar on "Close", "Synapse" and "Sound of View", "Cross" composed by Sugizo
 Miu Sakamoto; Aquascape (1999) – "Internal", "Eternal" and "Awakening (Endo Mix)" composed by Sugizo
 D.I.E.; Progressive (1999)
 Miki Nakatani; "Chronic Love", "Frontier" (1999)
 Coldfeet; Flavors (1999)
 Redrum; "Redrum" (1999) – producer
 Miu Sakamoto; Dawn Pink (1999) – "Internal", "Eternal" and "The Eighth Colour " composed by Sugizo
 Tomoe Shinohara; Deep Sound Channel (1999) – "Voyage" composed and produced by Sugizo
 Vivian Hsu; Jiaban de Tianshi (2000) – "他她", "魔鬼愛奢侈的眼淚" , "老夫婦", composed and produced by Sugizo
 Honeydip; Another Sunny Day (2000) – producer
 Paul Wong; Yellow Paul Wong (2001) – guitar on three tracks
 N.M.L. (No More Landmines); Zero Landmine (2001) – guitar
 Nicholas Tse; Jade Butterfly (2001) - “今天你生日”，“後遺”，“瘟疫”
 Inoran - Fragment - Erhu on track number 8 "艶".
 Red; "Saga" (2001) – producer
 Miu Sakamoto; "Sleep Away" (2002) – composed, arranged and produced by Sugizo
 Kiyoharu; Poetry (2004) – guitar on "Melancholy"
 Redrum; Second Circle (2004) – producer
 D'espairsRay; Born (2004) – violin on "Marry of the Blood"
 Miu Sakamoto; Oboro no Kanata, Akari no Kehai (2007) – producer
 Miyavi; "Hi no Hikari Sae Todokanai Kono Basho De" (2008) – guest guitarist on the title track
 Acid Black Cherry; Black List (2008) – guitar
 Toshi; Samurai Japan (2010)
 Tezya; Life My Babylon (2010) – on "Cosmo of Love"
 m.o.v.e.; "Overtakers" (2011) – guitar
 Japan United with Music; "All You Need Is Love" (2012) – guitar solo
 Ryuichi Kawamura; Concept RRR 「Never Fear」 (2014) – guitar on "Ai no Uta"
 Sukekiyo; Immortalis (2014) – remixed "Hemimetabolism" on the limited edition
 Kazumi Watanabe; Guitar is Beautiful KW45 (2016) – guest guitar on "Round Midnight" and "Island Hop"
 Dir en Grey; "Utafumi" (2016) – violin on "Kūkoku no Kyōon"
 Trustrick; Trick (2016) – violin on "I Wish You Were Here"
 Maon Kurosaki; "Vermillion" (2016) – composed and produced the title track
 Yoshiki feat. Hyde; "Red Swan" (2018) – guest guitar
 SawanoHiroyuki[nZk]; Remember (2019) – violin on "Glory -Into the RM-"
Mayo Suzukaze; Fairy ~A・I~ Ai (2021)  – composed "Chikyū no Namida"

Tribute album appearances 
 Auto-Mod; Tribute to Auto-Mod ~Flower in the Dark~ (1994) – on "Smell" and "Deathtopia"
 Japan; Life in Tokyo - A Tribute to Japan (September 4, 1996) – "Quiet Life" and on "Le Fou" by The Experience of Swimming
 Osamu Tezuka; Atom Kids Remix ~ 21 Century Boys and Girls (February 24, 1999) – remixed "Fushigi na Merumo" by Cibo Matto
 Anarchy; Q:Are we Anarchist? (June 23, 1999) – on "Reformation Child (Revolution Kids)"
 Yellow Magic Orchestra; YMO Remixes Technopolis 2000-00 (November 3, 2000) – remixed "Perspective"
 Yellow Magic Orchestra; Tribute to YMO (September 8, 2004) – remixed "1000 Knives"
 Gundam; Gundam Unplugged ～Acogi De Gundam A.c.2009～ (December 9, 2009) – "Beginning"
 Dead End; Dead End Tribute - Song of Lunatics (2013) – guitar on "Serafine"

Various artists compilation appearances 
 Dance 2 Noise 004 (January 21, 1993) – "Revive"
 Grand Cross (August 11, 1999) – "Aquarius After the Le Fou", "Luna-tica ~Life on the Hill Mix~ (Remixed by 4Hero)"
 Sugizo Compiles Global Music I (October 23, 2002)

References 

Discographies of Japanese artists